The 2003 European Athletics Junior Championships was held in Tampere, Finland from 23 to 27 July 2003. A total of 44 events were contested; 22 by men and 22 by women. Germany had the biggest medal haul with nine golds and a total of 26, closely followed by Russia (also 9 golds but 24 medals in total). Great Britain was third with 17 medals, while Romania was fourth with ten medals. Four championship records were set at the competition, although three were as a result of using lighter implements in the men's throwing events.

Nelson Évora was a stand-out performer, having won both the long jump and triple jump. Ivet Lalova of Bulgaria did the sprint double in the women's 100 metres and 200 metres, while Sophie Krauel showed her versatility by taking golds in the 100 metres hurdles and the long jump. The long-distance track events also provided opportunities for athletes to double up, as Inna Poluškina and Marius Ionescu both left the competition with a gold and a silver medal.

The men's javelin throw offered the chance for the hosts to demonstrate their ability in the country's favourite athletics event – the Finnish men swept the podium through the efforts of  Teemu Wirkkala, Tero Järvenpää, and Antti Ruuskanen. In the women's 2000 m steeplechase, Catalina Oprea set a world record in the rarely competed event, despite falling over mid-race. This was the last time that the women's 2000 metres steeplechase was held, as it was replaced by a 3000 m version in 2005.

Records

† = New mark established with a lighter junior throwing implement (6 kg shot and hammer, 1.75 kg discus)

Medal summary

Men

Women

Medal table

See also
2003 in athletics (track and field)

References

Results
European Junior Championships (Men). GBR Athletics. Retrieved on 2010-06-04.
European Junior Championships (Women). GBR Athletics. Retrieved on 2010-06-04.
Full results (archived)

European Athletics U20 Championships
A
E
European Athletics Junior Championships, 2003
2003 in youth sport
Sports competitions in Tampere